Hatton Fields is an unincorporated community southeast of downtown Carmel-by-the-Sea in Monterey County, California, United States. Homes have views of Carmel Valley, Point Lobos, and Carmel Bay. The residential neighborhood is bordered by Rio Road to the south, Hatton Road to the north, Hatton Canyon to the east, and Junipero Street to the west. The terrain is rolling and naturally landscaped with mature oaks, redwoods, and Monterey Pine trees. Carmel High School, Carmel Mission, and Flanders Mansion are landmarks in this neighborhood. Carmel Mission and Flanders Mansion are two properties that are listed on the National Register of Historic Places. The Mission Trail Nature Preserve runs adjacent to Hatton Fields. Homes are part of the Carmel Unified School District.

History

William Hatton (1849–1894), born in Ireland and married to Kate Harney (1851-1922), came to California in 1870. In 1888, Hatton became the manager of Rancho Cañada de la Segunda, which extended along the north bank of the Carmel River into the mouth of Carmel Valley. The land was owned by Dominga Doni de Atherton, the widowed wife of Faxon Atherton (namesake of Atherton, California). By 1892, Hatton purchased the Rancho from Dominga. Hatton operated a dairy business, which was located at Highway 1 and Carmel Valley Road, at the site of the present-day The Barnyard Shopping Village. When Hatton died in 1894, the land was left to his heirs. Anna, who was married to William Martin was given the area known as Martin Ranch (now Mission Ranch), Harrieta was given the area known as Rio Vista. Sarah was given the area known as Mission Fields. William Jr., received the area now east of Rio Vista, and Edward became owner of what became known as Hatton Fields. In 1921, the Hatton Fields was still being used for grazing cattle from the Hatton dairy.

William Hatton gave his name to Hatton Fields and to Hatton Canyon at Carmel Valley Road via a dirt trail at the mouth of Carmel Valley.     

Paul and Grace Flanders moved to Carmel in 1923, to construct a home and begin a real estate business. They purchased  of land from Dr. Daniel T. MacDougal, of the botanical laboratory for the Carnegie Institution in Carmel-by-the-Sea, California. Flanders designed a two-story home, which they named the Outlands in the Eighty Acres or Outlands at 25800 Hatton Road, located on a hill facing the Carmel Mission, and Point Lobos. Light grey interlocking Thermotite blocks, produced by the Carmel Thermotite Company, were used to build the home. Flanders planned on using his home as a model for a subdivision he planned to develop.

In 1925, Paul Flanders founded the Carmel Land Company to help develop Hatton Fields. He purchased  of property from the Hatton estate for $100,000. The new company formed an office in a stucco building on Ocean Avenue between Louis S. Slevin's general merchandise store and the Carmel Bakery. Paul Flanders was president, Ernest Schweninger was secretary and sales manager, and Peter Mawdsley was the treasurer. Hatton Fields was one of three major land developments adjacent to the Carmel city limits between 1922 and 1925.

The first to purchase land at Hatton Fields was director Perry Newberry. He said, "We are glad to live in Hatton Fields because we find there the seclusion that is no longer obtainable at a moderate price in Carmel property." Stockholders in the Carmel Land Company were Flanders, Schweninger, Harry Leon Wilson, Charles King Van Riper, Fred Ruhl, and Carmel Martin. Initial sales went well.

On August 4, 1939, the company sold  of the Hatton property for $31,000 for the Carmel High School. The school opened on September 6, 1940.

The Abalone League had its beginning on Carmel Point in 1921. They played two games on Sunday and had three playing fields, at Carmel Point, Carmel Woods, and the Hatton Fields.

In January 1947, the Carmel Land Company was sold to Charles A. Fuller's Carmel Company for $150,000. Schweninger continued as sales manager with the new company. Included in the sale were all the unsold portions of Hatton Fields tract consisting of 40-50 lots. Fuller was resident of Carmel for over 20 years. Fuller wanted to open the tract for development.

Throughout the years, homes were sold in the Hatton Fields neighborhood. In 2021, 13 homes were sold in Hatton Fields.

See also
 National Register of Historic Places listings in Monterey County, California
 List of places in California
 Timeline of Carmel-by-the-Sea, California

References

External links

  Hatton Fields California

Unincorporated communities in Monterey County, California
1925 establishments in California
Populated places established in 1925
Populated coastal places in California
Unincorporated communities in California